Hackers & Painters: Big Ideas from the Computer Age is a collection of essays from Paul Graham discussing hacking, programming languages, start-up companies, and many other technological issues.
"Hackers & Painters" is also the title of one of those essays.

Table of contents 
 Why Nerds Are Unpopular
 Hackers and Painters
 What You Can't Say
 Good Bad Attitude
 The Other Road Ahead
 How to Make Wealth
 Mind the Gap
 A Plan for Spam
 Taste for Makers
 Programming Languages Explained
 The Hundred-Year Language
 Beating the Averages
 Revenge of the Nerds
 The Dream Language
 Design and Research

Publication data

References

External links 
Paul Graham's essays online, including some of the essays in the book
Slashdot Review: Hackers & Painters
Dabblers and Blowhards: Essay by a hacker and painter.

Computer books
American essay collections
O'Reilly Media books